= Knocked down =

Knocked down may refer to:

- Knock-down kit, a collection of parts required to assemble a product
- Knockout, in combat sports
